Oatlands is an important historical village on the shores of Lake Dulverton in the centre of Tasmania, Australia. Oatlands is located 84 km north of  Hobart and 115 km south of Launceston on the Midland Highway.  At the 2016 census, Oatlands had a population of 683.

Oatlands is considered to have the largest number of colonial sandstone buildings in any town in Australia, and many of them were built by convict labour. It is the largest town in the Southern Midlands Council area and is surrounded by rich agricultural land.

History
Oatlands is one of Tasmania's oldest settlements and was named by Governor Macquarie after an English town in the county of Surrey in 1821.  It was developed as a military base for the control and management of convicts because of its central location between Hobart and Launceston.  Convicts were assigned to nearby farms and properties, and also worked on public buildings, roads and bridges.

Oatlands Post Office opened on 1 June 1832.

Much of the Black War (early settlers against local aborigines) took place in the surrounding districts, and Oatlands was also the home of the ex-convict Solomon Blay, Tasmania's most feared hangman. There are a number of unique landmarks in Oatlands, including the Callington Mill and St Pauls' Church. The mill was built in 1837 and was restored to working order during June/July 2010, and the Catholic Church was designed by Augustus Welby Pugin, the father of Gothic Revival architecture.

For some years after 1848, Oatlands was the place of exile of the Irish nationalist leader Kevin Izod O'Doherty, where his stone cottage  still stands. A railway connected Oatlands with Parattah Junction, on the main Hobart to Launceston line. The railway opened on 13 May 1885 and it closed on 10 June 1949.

Oatlands was generally a relatively prosperous town in the 20th century but by the 1990s the Tasmanian economy slump, the highway bypass and a Tasmanian Midlands rural drought had a very negative effect on the town. Much of Tasmania's economic renewal, like the highway, has bypassed Oatlands, along with Ross, Tunbridge, Kempton, and Pontville, which today is a lot quieter than it used to be.  The residents are attempting to grow the town once more by making it a peaceful local centre with a tourist friendly image.  

The Oatlands Court House is an historic Georgian building in Oatlands. Built by convict labour in 1829, the Oatlands Court House is the oldest supreme court house in rural Australia and the oldest building in Oatlands. This fine example of a Georgian public building was originally constructed as a combined Chapel and Police Office. It was purchased by the National Trust in 1977.

Oatlands has the largest collection of sandstone buildings in a village setting in Australia. The town’s authentic colonial character is reflected in 87 original sandstone buildings along the town’s main street. The stone for their construction was quarried along the shores of Lake Dulverton. Some of the more significant buildings include the Oatlands gaol (1835), Commissariat’s store and watch house (1830s) and officers’ quarters (1830s). The Callington Mill (1837) is the only working example of a Lincolnshire windmill in Australia.

Climate

Media
Oatlands is served by 97.1 MID FM "The Voice of the Midlands"

References

External links

Wild, Blue and Free TV Series Oatlands and surrounds: Online photo album, art gallery, facts, map and video clips (locally produced in Oatlands/Parattah)
Callington Mill Restored Georgian windmill built in 1837
Companion Bakery
Casaveen Knitwear

Towns in Tasmania
Localities of Southern Midlands Council
1821 establishments in Australia
Populated places established in 1821